Zonad is a film by John and Kieran Carney that premiered in July 2009 at the Galway Film Fleadh.
The film went to general release in Ireland March 19, 2010.

Premise 

An escaped convict fools a whole Irish village into thinking he's a visitor from outer space. Zonad, a strange visitor comes to the town of Ballymoran, is taken in by the Cassidy family and accepted by the locals as an extraterrestrial. His comfortable existence is spoiled when Bonad arrives to replace him.

Unreleased short film version 

In 2003, John Carney co-wrote and co-directed an earlier version of Zonad, a short film, with Kieran Carney and Tom Hall. Starring Simon Delaney and Cillian Murphy, Zonad was low-budget and was never released. Murphy played the role of Guy Hendrickson, later played by Rory Keenan.

Cast 

 Simon Delaney as Zonad, Liam Murphy.
 David Pearse as Bonad, Francis O'Connor. Bonad is Zonad's superior officer.
 Geoff Minogue as Dick Cassidy
 Donna Dent as Mary Cassidy
 Janice Byrne as Jenny Cassidy
 Kevin Maher as Jimmy Cassidy
 Rory Keenan as Guy Hendrickson
 David Murray as Benson, Guy Hendrickson's loyal manservant.
 Don Wycherley as a police sergeant

Production 
It was filmed in Avoca, Co Wicklow, with many of the outdoor scenes filmed in the garden of Kilqueeny House in the village.  The interior bar scenes were filmed in The Harbour Bar in Bray, Co. Wicklow, which was also used in Neil Jordan's Breakfast on Pluto.

Reception

Critical response 

The Irish Times wrote "We laughed like the proverbial drain".
Variety writer John Anderson describe it as a "nutroll of a comedy" made from equal parts Pleasantville, The Quiet Man and the old Carry On films.

The Evening Herald wrote "Awful, and with a disturbingly sleazy undercurrent to boot".

Awards and recognition 

Shortlisted for an Irish Film and Television Award (ITFA) with Brian Byrne winning for Best Original Score.

References

External links 
 
 
 
 

Irish comedy films
2009 films
2009 comedy films
2000s English-language films
Films shot in the Republic of Ireland
Films set in Ireland
Films directed by John Carney